Sir John Watson may refer to:

 Sir John Watson Gordon (1788–1864), Scottish painter
 Sir John Watson (polo), English polo player and winner of the International Polo Cup in 1876 
 Sir John Watson (Indian Army officer) (1829–1919), English recipient of the Victoria Cross in 1857
 Sir John Watson (advocate) (1883–1944), Scottish advocate and sheriff, Solicitor General for Scotland 1929–31